The Cabinet of Maximilian I of Mexico was formed by the holders of the Ministries of State of Mexico appointed by Emperor Maximilian I during the Second Mexican Empire, from 10 April 1864 to 15 May 1867.

Cabinet

See also 
 Maximilian I of Mexico
 Second Mexican Empire
 Cabinet

References 

Government_of_Mexico
Second
 05
.
.
Mexican monarchy
Former monarchies
1860s in Mexico
History of Mexico
Political history of Mexico
French colonization of the Americas